Svetlana A. Tatunts, (* 1953 in Baku, USSR) - Armenian born Russian researcher of sociology, ethnicity, ethnic and national conflicts. Full professor at the Department of World Politics of Moscow State University named after Lomonosov (MSU).

Biography 
Svetlana A. Tatunts graduated from the History Department of Baku State University in 1978 and earned a Ph.D. in social sciences from MSU in 1983. After several years as an associate professor, she earned a Doctor of Science degree for her Sc.D. thesis on "Ethnosociology as a science" at the MSU Faculty of Sociology in 1996. The year before, she conducted research at the Sociology Department of Regensburg University, Germany.

Tatunts taught at the MSU Faculty of Sociology from 1998 to 2008. Thanks to her efforts, the discipline of ethnosociology has become a part of the academic curriculum for social and political science students at MSU and other Russian universities. She was the author of the Russian State curriculum for “Ethnosociology” and “Ethnics in political sciences”  according to the State standard of the Russian Ministry of Education and Science and mentor for numerous Ph.D. and Master’s theses in these fields.

In 2008, Tatunts changed to the MSU Faculty of World politics where she lectures at the chair in Regional Problems of World Politics and does research. Tatunts is a member of the Russian Sociological Association  and the International Institute of Sociology. She holds a Certificate of Honor of the Russian Ministry of Education and Science and was recognized as an Honored Professor of Moscow State University.

Research interests 

Tatunts wrote more than 70 scientific works in the field of sociology, political science and conflict studies, published in Russia and abroad, including German, English, Spanish and Italian articles.  The regional focus of her research lies on the C.I.S. countries, as well as Central and Western Europe and Latin America. 

Her particular scientific interests are in interethnic relations, ethnic minorities, tolerance and xenophobia, ethnic migration processes in the modern world, the integration of immigrants in Eastern and Western European countries. She also works on ethnic conflict and diaspora as а factor of modern foreign policy and political conflict resolution in C.I.S. countries.

Selected works 

 Will autumn come to „nationalism“? About nation, nationalism and national politics. Moscow, 1995
 Interethnical contradictions and conflicts in the North Caucasus region of the Russian Federation. Opladen: Westdeutscher Verlag 1997, pp. 216-226
 Ethnopolitical conflicts and geopolitical factors (scientific editor, author: O.I.Arshba), Moscow, 1998
 Ethnosociology, Moscow, 1999
 Nation and nationalism. History and theory in texts and documents, Moscow, 2002
 Immigration, Integration, Naturalization. Experiences of Western European countries (scientific editor, author: O.I.Arshba), Moscow, 2012
 European idea defeats right-wing populism in European elections, co-author K. Berndt Public administration (Государственная служба), № 5, 2019, pp. 76-82
 Politics of memory of the Armenian Diaspora in Latin America, co-author A.M. Ponamareva, Ibéroamerica, № 4, 2020, pp. 124-144
 Germany's Soft Power Policy in Latin America, Ibéroamerica, № 4, 2021, pp. 80-100
 The global crisis of COVID-19 in the Latin American region in the context of the "North-South" divide, Ibéroamerica, № 1, 2022, pp. 160-180

References 

1953 births
Living people
Armenian political scientists
Academic staff of Moscow State University
Russian people of Armenian descent
Russian sociologists
Russian women sociologists
Women political scientists